SKF-77,434 is a drug which acts as a selective dopamine D1 receptor partial agonist, and has stimulant and anorectic effects. Unlike other D1 agonists with higher efficacy such as SKF-81,297 and 6-Br-APB, SKF-77,434 does not maintain self-administration in animal studies, and so has been researched as a potential treatment for cocaine addiction.

References 

1-Phenyl-2,3,4,5-tetrahydro-1H-3-benzazepines
D1-receptor agonists
Allyl compounds
Catechols